Villeneuve Minervois XIII are a French Rugby league team based in Villeneuve-Minervois in the region of Aude in the south of France. Founded in 2008 they currently compete in the National Division 1. Home games are played at the Stade Vitali Cros.

History
Founded in 2008 by current chairman Alain Ginies the club entered the French Rugby League pyramid at the 3rd tier National Division 1 level after a league re-structure. In season 2015/16 the club enjoyed their best campaign finishing 3rd

Current squad 
Squad for 2022-23 season;
Julien Agullo - 
Clement Arrans
Mathieu Bardou
Yassine Belkacemi
Mehdi Belkoniene
Jeremy Bernardo
Clement Cartier - 
Sebastien Chapelet
Tristan De Souza
Benjamin Diaz - 
Leopold Eldine - 
Mounir El Jaghmati
Romain Frezouls
Guillaume Gres
Ismail Jyed
Yacine Laaras
Brandon Lo
Remi Loup
Matthias Martinez
Mickael Mayans
Kevin Prainito
Abdessamad Rachid - 
Terrence Rouibah
Christophe Second - 
Jonathan Soum - 
Julien Talieu - 
Damien Tetart - 
Florent Tost - 
Theau Traquini
Geoffrey Zava - 
Fahed Zine -

See also
 National Division 1

References

French rugby league teams
Rugby clubs established in 2008
2008 establishments in France